Where Got Ghost? is a Singaporean omnibus comedy horror film directed by Jack Neo and Boris Boo. This film is Neo's first attempt with horror flicks.

Plot
The film is made up of three omnibus horror tales laced with Singaporean humour. In sequence, they are "Roadside Got Ghost", "Forest Got Ghost" and "House Got Ghost".

Episodes

Roadside Got Ghost
Directed By: Jack Neo

Swindlers Cai, Fu and Shou are returning to Cai's house after a successful scam. Cai becomes hungry and tells his accomplices to buy him some food while he returned home. As it is late at night and they are too lazy to walk to the shops, Fu and Shou decide to steal some oranges from the roadside, placed there as offerings during the Hungry Ghost Festival. Cai eats the oranges and complains that they are tasteless.

Later, the three men devise a new scheme - they would make phone calls from the phone book and each person they called would receive a random 4D lottery number, with enough calls to cover every possible combination from 0000 to 9999. Those who win the lottery are required to pay 20% commission to Cai or fall victim to harassments from loansharks. This initially works and the three set up a company, which was largely successful.

One day, Cai receives a phone call. The caller gives Cai a lottery number, deploying the same hotline trick. Believing him to be a competitor, Cai naturally disregards the call, but goes ahead and tries his luck with the given number anyway. To his surprise, he wins first and second prize for the same number.

On his way home with his two sidekicks, a pale-faced man suddenly confronts Cai for his commission. After teasing the man and refusing to pay, Cai receives the warning that he will be run over by a car. Cai laughs it off and runs into the middle of the road to prove it is all a hoax scare. He actually does get crushed by a car overturning from an overhead highway. As Cai dies, the driver of the car is revealed to be a spirit who tells Cai never to steal her oranges again. In the ending scene, hundreds of oranges start to roll onto a dying Cai in the middle of the road.

Forest Got Ghost
Directed By: Jack Neo

Nan and Lei are attending their army NS reservist training and had to trek through a jungle to reach a checkpoint using a map. Along the way, they become lost and decide to take a short cut through a supposedly haunted jungle, where they find the tombstone of a young woman in the middle of nowhere. After night falls, the two soldiers notice a woman in a red dress watching them from a distance, which frightened them.

There is a huge thunderstorm the next morning. Nan and Lei meet a plump girl named Yin Yin with a white umbrella selling drinks and sought refuge at her house. There, they encounter the woman in the red dress again, and run for their lives. Yin Yin catches up with them after a while and explains that it was her, and not a ghost, that they saw back in the house. She persuades them to return to her house, making them feel more comfortable by performing magic. After a demonstration, Nan and Lei allow themselves to be strapped to chairs and noosed so they can learn one of Yin Yin's magic tricks.

However, it was a trap. The two men are left hanging on a tree outside the house, as the two girls, Yin Yin and the other female ghost, are ready to depart now that they have found two people to take their place. As an epilogue, the story skips to the following year where another batch of soldiers arrives for reservist training. Once again, two of them get lost and take a shortcut. The story ends with them wandering through the forest and stopping in front of Nan and Lei.

House Got Ghost
Directed By: Boris Boo

This was a short sequel to Money No Enough 2. It is the Seventh Lunar Month and three brothers - Baohui, Baohuang and Baoqiang - all pay respects to their deceased mother. They complain bitterly to their mother that they are doing poorly financially, and that their mother is not assisting them supernaturally. Soon afterwards, however, strange things begin to happen at their homes. The brothers all claim to see or hear their mother on numerous occasions - Huang and Qiang whilst sleeping and Hui while trying to fix the TV signal. 

One day, they encounter a friend whose mother died in the morning, and who has since become wealthy. Assuming that parents dying in the night will bring bad luck, Baoqiang and Baohuang overrule Baohui and urge him to bring their mother's remains to a temple. Baohui then attempts to bring their mother's urn and tablet to a temple, but is shocked to find it reappearing in his car later. He immediately calls his brothers to accompany him, but they think he is overreacting.

During a car journey from Malaysia, the ghostly apparition of their mother suddenly appears on the road before them, causing Baohuang to swerve and nearly crash off a cliff. Fortunately, the brothers manage to crawl out unscathed. As they wonder over their mother's sudden appearance, they witness a massive landslide along the road ahead, leading to them realizing that by causing them to swerve, their mother actually saved their lives.

In the epilogue, the three brothers reclaim their mother's urn and tablet from the temple, and encounter the same wealthy friend, who now has cancer and wails that his mother did not bless him well. As the three drive home, now having realized the true fortune that their mother had brought - health, peace, and safety - Yang's spirit appears above, smiling, and waves to the audience.

Cast
Part 1: Roadside Got Ghost
Richard Low as Cai
 Tony Koh Beng Hoe as Fu
Marcus Chin as Shou
 Yoo Ah Min (Lao Zabor, literally "Old Woman")

Part 2: Forest Got Ghost
John Cheng as Reservist Nan
 Wang Lei as Reservist Lei
David Bala as 1WO Muthu, Regimental Sergeant Major
 Seth Ang as LTA H U Ang, Officer Commanding

Part 3 : House Got Ghost
Henry Thia as Yang Baohui
Mark Lee as Yang Baohuang
Jack Neo as Yang Baoqiang
Anna Lin Ruping as Lin Xiuyun, Baohui's Wife
Vivian Lai as Zhou Yanyan, Baohuang's Wife
Choo Lingling as Zhang Lingling, Baoqiang's Wife
Natalli Ong Ai Wen as Stella Yang, Baoqiang's daughter
Lai Meng as Mother Yang, Mother of Baohui, Baohuang and Baoqiang
Wang Lei as Wealthy friend of Baohui, Baohuang and Baoqiang

See also
List of ghost films

References

 http://www.mediacorptv.sg/en/buzzdetail/EDC090805-0000155

External links
 
 Review of the film 'Where Got Ghost?'

Singaporean comedy horror films
2000s comedy horror films
Films directed by Jack Neo
2009 comedy films
2009 films